Deh-e Jehil (also Romanized as Deh-e Jehīl; also known as Deh-e Jīhel) is a village in Abreis Rural District, Bazman District, Iranshahr County, Sistan and Baluchestan Province, Iran. At the 2006 census, its population was 68, in 14 families.

References 

Populated places in Iranshahr County